Major General David Matheson Butler,  (3 September 1928 – 24 November 2020) was senior officer of the Australian Army. He saw service during the Korean War with the 3rd Battalion, Royal Australian Regiment, and later as the commanding officer of 6th Battalion, Royal Australian Regiment during the Vietnam War.

Notes

External links
 Interview with Major General David Butler AO, DSO, by Major Ian Cruickshank, 9 September 1993, awm.gov.au

1928 births
2020 deaths
People from Perth, Western Australia
Australian generals
Australian military personnel of the Korean War
Australian military personnel of the Vietnam War
Australian Companions of the Distinguished Service Order
Officers of the Order of Australia
Foreign recipients of the Silver Star
Military personnel from Western Australia